Unaiuba is a genus of beetles in the family Cerambycidae, first described by Ubirajara Ribeiro Martins and Maria Helena Mainieri Galileo in 2011.

Species 
Unaiuba contains the following species:
 Unaiuba aulai (Bruch, 1911)
 Unaiuba beltiana (Bates, 1885)
 Unaiuba bruchi (Melzer, 1927)
 Unaiuba catarina (Napp & Monne, 2006)
 Unaiuba flava Martins & Galileo, 2011
 Unaiuba giesberti (Chemsak & Noguera, 1993)
 Unaiuba icterica (Gounelle, 1911)
 Unaiuba ion (Chevrolat, 1860)
 Unaiuba ludicrus (Melzer, 1934)
 Unaiuba m-fasciata Schmid, 2015
 Unaiuba pinima (Galileo & Martins, 2007)
 Unaiuba sarukhani (Chemsak & Noguera, 1993)
 Unaiuba vitellina (Martins & Galileo, 2008)
 Unaiuba vitticollis (Aurivillius, 1920)
 Unaiuba zonata (Martins & Galileo, 2008)

References

Clytini